Rattlesnake Key is a key (island) in a part of Tampa Bay in Manatee County, Florida.

References

External links
YouTube video of kayaking around Rattlesnake Key
YouTube video with underwater and above water views off Rattlesnake Key

Islands of Manatee County, Florida
Islands of Tampa Bay
Islands of Florida